The 26th Marine Expeditionary Unit (26th MEU) is one of seven Marine Expeditionary Units currently in existence in the United States Marine Corps. It is an air-ground task force with a strength of about 2,400 personnel when at full strength during a deployment. It consists of four major parts: a command element, a ground combat element, an aviation combat element, and a logistics combat element. Since its establishment in the early 1970s as the 26th Marine Amphibious Unit, it has deployed extensively, and participated in numerous combat and contingency operations, as well as training exercises. The 26th MEU is based out of Marine Corps Base Camp Lejeune in the U.S. state of North Carolina.

Current major subordinate elements
As of 6 December 2013, the 26th MEU is decomposed and does not have reinforcing commands.  The following units participated in the MEU's deployment from March–November 2013:

Ground Combat Element: Battalion Landing Team 3/2

Aviation Combat Element: Marine Medium Tiltrotor Squadron 162 (Rein) VMM-162

Logistics Combat Element: Combat Logistics Battalion 26

History

Early years
The 26th Marine Expeditionary Unit was established on 24 April 1967 for a short mission, and was quickly deactivated (as was the norm during this period) on 20 October 1967.  During June–December 1969, the MEU was reactivated as the 36th Marine Expeditionary Unit for Exercise Landing Force Caribbean 3-69 (LANFORCARIB 3-69).

In 1975 the 36th Marine Amphibious Unit participated in Exercise Staff Zugel in West Germany. This marked the first time since World War I that the USMC took a combined arms force ashore in Germany. The unit was redesignated as the 26th Marine Amphibious Unit in 1982 and became part of the rotation cycle of three MAUs on the East Coast in 1985. It was the first of the MAUs to undergo Special Operations Capable training, earn the SOC qualification and have AV-8B Harriers attached. In 1988 the unit was again redesignated as the 26th Marine Expeditionary Unit.

1990s through 2000
In 1991 the MEU supported Operation Desert Shield by providing a "Show of Force" in the Mediterranean, and participated in Operation Sharp Edge, a non-combatant evacuation operation of Liberia. The next year saw the MEU participating in Operation Provide Promise, Operation Deny Flight and Operation Sharp Guard off the coast of Yugoslavia.

In 1994 the 26th MEU participated in ceremonies marking the 50th Anniversary of the D-Day invasion of Normandy, France.  The MEU also supported Operation Restore Hope off the coast of Somalia and participated in continued operations in Bosnia.

Three years later the 26th MEU launched Operation Silver Wake, evacuating U.S. citizens and foreign nationals from Albania, and also participated in Operation Guardian Retrieval, the staging of forces in the Congo for a possible evacuation of Zaire.

In 1998 the 26th MEU served as the Headquarters for the Strategic Reserve Force during Exercise Dynamic Response in Bosnia. The SRF is a multinational force made up of forces from the Netherlands, Spain, Italy, Romania, Poland and the United States.

The 26th MEU played a notable role in the Balkan conflict.  In 1998 it participated in Operation Determined Falcon, the one-day NATO aerial show-of-force in Kosovo. In April to May 1999 it took part in Operation Noble Anvil and Operation Shining Hope.  While supporting Noble Anvil, NATO's bombing campaign in Kosovo, with AV-8B Harrier attack aircraft, the 26th MEU also provided security for Kosovar refugees at Camps Hope and Eagle in Albania. From June to July 1999 it participated in Operation Joint Guardian. As the first U.S. peacekeepers in Kosovo, the 26th MEU helped provide stability to the embattled region.

August 1999 saw the 26th MEU taking part in Operation Avid Response, providing Humanitarian Assistance to the people of Western Turkey left homeless by a devastating earthquake.

The 26th MEU conducted Adriatic presence operations during the election crisis in the Federal Republic of Yugoslavia, September 2000. The MEU also participated in exercises Atlas Hinge in Tunisia and Croatian Phibex 2000, the first ever bi-lateral exercise between the Marine Corps and the Croatian Armed Forces. During the next two months the MEU supported diplomatic initiatives during unrest in Israel while simultaneously taking part in the NATO exercise Destined Glory 2000, and continued to break new ground by the second ever bi-lateral exercise between the Marine Corps and the Croatian Armed Forces, exercise Slunj 2000.

Global War on Terrorism

Following the events of 11 September 2001, the 26th MEU was among the first U.S. forces into Afghanistan as part of Operation Enduring Freedom and Operation Swift Freedom. From December 2001 to February 2002, 26th MEU (SOC) Marines reinforced the 15th MEU (SOC) who had conducted the 450 mile seizure of Camp Rhino in November 2001 and Kandahar International Airport in December 2001. Both MEUs worked together and constructed a detainment facility that held more than 400 Taliban and Al Qaeda terrorists.

From April to May 2003, the 26th MEU participated in the 2003 invasion of Iraq, supporting Operation Iraqi Freedom by conducting operations in Erbil and Mosul, Iraq. It was inserted via CH-53 and KC-130 and conducted combat operations until relieved by the 101st Airborne Division.

The 26th MEU served as the primary tactical unit for Joint Task Force Liberia during Operation Sheltering Sky from August to September 2003 in the Second Liberian Civil War. The MEU capitalized on its extensive training in humanitarian assistance operations and U.S. embassy relations to help bring peace to the war-torn nation following the exile of former Liberian president Charles Taylor.

Marines and sailors from the 26th MEU conducted Operation Sea Horse from July to August 2005, supporting British-led Multi-National Division Southeast with a mission to detect and deter illicit activity along the Iraqi border. The MEU maintained command and control of Operation Sea Horse from aboard ship in the Northern Persian Gulf, while simultaneously and concurrently conducting training missions in Saudi Arabia and Djibouti.

In August 2008, the 26th MEU deployed aboard the ships of the USS Wasp Strike Group. During the deployment, the 26th MEU detached to support combat operations in Iraq and in support of anti-piracy operations in the Gulf of Aden.

In August 2010, the 26th MEU sailed with the Kearsarge Amphibious Ready Group a month early for their scheduled deployment in order to assist with disaster relief operations in Pakistan.

In early March 2016, the 26th MEU took part in the Iraq Campaign of Operation Inherent Resolve against ISIL. Marines deployed to northern Iraq to set up Firebase Bell near Makhmur to support Iraqi forces in their eventual offensive to liberate ISIL-occupied Mosul. On March 19, 2016, ISIS militants attacked the fire base killing 1 Marine and injuring a further 8, the following day, coalition commanders announced that it was deploying additional Marines from the 26th MEU to Iraq.

Involvement in Operation Odyssey Dawn
Beginning on 19 March 2011 the 26th MEU took part in Operation Odyssey Dawn to help enforce the Libyan no-fly zone. On 22 March, two MV-22 Osprey, containing a payload of twenty five USMC Recon members as a TRAP force, and operated by the 26th MEU operating off of  recovered the pilot of a USAF F-15E Strike Eagle who ejected after an equipment malfunction. The Weapons Systems Officer was recovered by Libyan rebels and returned to U.S. forces unharmed.

Hurricane Sandy disaster relief operations

In November 2012, the 26th MEU self-deployed from Camp Lejeuene aboard MV-22B Osprey to the USS Wasp, which was stationed in New York Bay in the aftermath of Hurricane Sandy.  There, the MEU conducted Defense Support to Civil Authorities (DSCA) operations, clearing debris, distributing food and water, and providing aid and comfort to the residents of Staten Island and Rockaway, Queens.  The Marines and Sailors would move ashore by helicopter or surface craft in the morning, conduct disaster relief operations during the day, and return to the ship at night to put less strain on the stressed infrastructure ashore.

Notable facts
 1995 -- The first MEU to deploy with M1A1 Abrams Main Battle Tanks.
 1996 -- The first MEU to deploy with the Joint Task Force Enabler (JTFE) communications package.
 November 2000 -- The 26th MEU's Battalion Landing Team, BLT 2/2, launched the first ever FGM-148 Javelin anti-tank missile fired by a deployed MEU.
 November 2001 -- During Operation Enduring Freedom, the 26th MEU became one of the first units to engage enemy forces in Afghanistan after the terrorist attacks of 9/11.
 April 2003 -- In 2003, during Operation Iraqi Freedom, Marine Corps KC-130s traveled  and delivered more than 1,000 men directly to the battlefield in Mosul, Iraq - a feat never before attempted.
 January 2007 -- The MEU is the first to deploy with a MARSOC attachment.
 March 2009 -- The 26th MEU completes the final scheduled East Coast MEU deployment with the CH-46 Sea Knight helicopter, which is being replaced by the MV-22 Osprey.
 August 2010 -- The first MEU to deploy with an Everything over Internet Protocol (EoIP) configured Joint Task Force Enabler (JTFE) communications package.

Unit awards
The 26th MEU has been awarded the following unit awards and Campaign streamers:

Navy Unit Commendation with three Bronze Stars
 Libya—1986
 Kosovo—1999
 Afghanistan—2001–2002
 Liberia 2003

Meritorious Unit Commendation with two Bronze Stars
 Libya—1985-1987
 Albania—1996–1998
 Turkey—1999

Marine Corps Expeditionary Streamer with one Bronze Star

National Defense Service Streamer with one Bronze Star

Kosovo Campaign Streamer with two Bronze Stars

Global War on Terrorism Expeditionary Streamer

Iraq Campaign Medal Streamer (Liberation of Iraq)

See also

 List of Marine Expeditionary Units
 List of United States Marine Corps battalions
 List of United States Marine Corps aircraft squadrons
 List of United States Marine Corps logistics groups

References

Notes

External links

 

26
Military units and formations established in 1975